is a railway station in the city of Kariya, Aichi Prefecture, Japan, operated by Central Japan Railway Company (JR Tōkai).

Lines
Noda-Shimmachi Station is served by the Tōkaidō Main Line, and is located 339.7 kilometers from the starting point of the line at Tokyo Station.

Station layout
The station has two opposed side platforms connected by a footbridge. The station building has automated ticket machines, TOICA automated turnstiles and is staffed.

Platforms

Adjacent stations

Station history
Noda-Shinmachi Station opened on 18 March 2007.

Station numbering was introduced to the section of the Tōkaidō Line operated JR Central in March 2018; Noda-Shinmachi Station was assigned station number CA57.

Passenger statistics
In fiscal 2017, the station was used by an average of 2488 passengers daily.

Surrounding area
 Kariya Toyota General Hospital
Kariya Higashi High School

See also
 List of Railway Stations in Japan

References

Yoshikawa, Fumio. Tokaido-sen 130-nen no ayumi. Grand-Prix Publishing (2002) .

External links

official home page 

Railway stations in Japan opened in 2007
Railway stations in Aichi Prefecture
Tōkaidō Main Line
Stations of Central Japan Railway Company
Kariya, Aichi